Wu Chau is the name of two islands of Hong Kong:

 Wu Chau (North District)
 Wu Chau (Tai Po District)

Wu Chau is also an old transliteration of the Chinese city of Wuzhou